Siwash Rock is a rock outcropping in Vancouver, British Columbia, Canada's Stanley Park. A legend among the Indigenous Squamish people surrounds the rock. It became known to mariners as Nine Pin Rock for its resemblance to a bowling pin.

Geology 
About 32 million years ago, a volcanic dike formed in the sedimentary rock that forms the foundation of the park (sandstone and mudstone). Magma was forced to the surface through a fissure in the Earth's crust creating the basalt stack, which is more resistant to erosion than the softer sandstone cliffs. Siwash Rock is the only such sea stack in the Vancouver area.

Name 

The Squamish name for the rock is Slhx̱i7lsh.  This name refers to the story of a man transformed by X̱aays. The hole in the rock is where Slhx̱i7lsh kept his fishing tackle, according to Andrew Paull. In Legends of Vancouver, poet Pauline Johnson relates a Squamish legend of how a man was transformed into Siwash Rock "as an indestructible monument to Clean Fatherhood." A plaque near the rock (pictured) states that it is "Skalsh the unselfish", who was transformed by "Q'uas the transformer" as a reward for unselfishness.

There is some controversy over the name of the rock. "Siwash" is a Chinook Jargon word for a person of First Nations or Native American heritage. Though the word 'siwash' in the jargon did not necessarily have a negative connotation and was used by native peoples themselves, its etymology can be traced to the French word "sauvage", which means wild or undomesticated. The word is considered by some to be derisive, but remains in use in certain place names and other contexts without derogatory associations, as with Siwash Rock, Siwash Sweater, etc.

History 

Up on the cliffs overlooking Siwash Rock is a lookout point off the Siwash hiking trail. While today it is an ideal spot for park users to admire the scenery, it was known as "Fort Siwash" during the wars. An artillery battery was mounted there in the First World War, as were searchlights in the next war. A runaway mountain goat, according to park board lore, lived free in this area for almost a year in the mid-1960s until he was hit by a car and died in another area in the park. Also residing in this area, until he was arrested shortly after the Second World War, was a man living in a nearby cave for a 17-year period interrupted only by his service overseas to fight in the war.

The small Douglas fir atop Siwash Rock that helped make it such a distinctive landmark for the first generations of Vancouverites did not survive the exceptionally dry summer of 1965. An article on the tree's passing in the Vancouver Sun reads more like an obituary than news story, quoting former Vancouver Member of Parliament, H. H. Stevens as saying "I've known that tree for about 68 years now and I'm sorry the tree has died because it was one of our main attractions in Stanley Park." A park superintendent felt sure that it was "virtually impossible to establish another fir up on the rock from a young plant." Less than three years later, however, while park crews were still working to restore the park's forest from the devastation of Typhoon Freda, persistent efforts were rewarded when new saplings finally began taking root.

In 2017, Vancouver Park Board commissioner Catherine Evans introduced a motion to change the rock's official name to Slhx̱í7lsh. As Siwash is derived etymologically from sauvage (the French word for savage), Evans said: "We shouldn't have a name for any part of our land that is derogatory to the Indigenous people of this land." Indigenous comedian JR Redwater quipped "They say 'Siwash Rock' has to be changed because it's from an Indian word, derived from a French word, that's kinda-sorta-but-not-really a racial slur. That's like black people being offended by the Rio Negro."

See also 
 History of the Squamish people

References 
 Clague, John J.; Alison Parkinson, Vancouver Natural History Society (2006). Wilderness on the Doorstep: Discovering Nature in Stanley Park. Vancouver: Harbour Publishing.
 Barman, Jean (2005). Stanley Park's Secret: The Forgotten Families of Whoi Whoi, Kanaka Ranch and Brockton Point. Vancouver: Harbour Publishing.
 Johnson, Pauline, Legends of Vancouver. Vancouver: Thompson Stationery Co., 1911. (Project Gutenberg) 
 Steele, Mike (1993). Vancouver's Famous Stanley Park: The Year-Round Playground. Vancouver:Heritage House. .

Footnotes

External links 
 Origin of the legend surrounding the rock
 Siwash Rock ~1912 (Rosetti Studio - Stanley Park Collection, UBC)

Chinook Jargon place names
History of Vancouver
Religious places of the indigenous peoples of North America
Rock formations of Canada
Stanley Park
Squamish people
Stacks of Canada